Prosthecomicrobium pneumaticum is an aerobic bacterium from the genus of Prosthecomicrobium which has been isolated from freshwater.

References

Further reading

External links
Type strain of Prosthecomicrobium pneumaticum at BacDive -  the Bacterial Diversity Metadatabase

Hyphomicrobiales
Bacteria described in 1968